Driven to Kill is a 2009 American action film directed by Jeff F. King, starring Steven Seagal, Mike Dopud, Igor Jijikine and Robert Wisden. The film was released on direct-to-DVD in the United States on May 19, 2009.

Plot
Ruslan Drachev (Steven Seagal) is a former Russian mobster and a current writer of hardboiled pulp fiction novels living in California when he gets a call from his ex-wife Catherine (Inna Korobkina) that his daughter Lanie (Laura Mennell) is getting married.

Not wanting to miss the wedding, Ruslan catches the red eye to New Jersey and heads into Trenton to see Lanie, who is an attorney in the D.A.'s office in Trenton. Ruslan is somewhat concerned that Lanie is marrying Stephan Abramov (Dmitry Chepovetsky), the son of Mikhail Abramov (Igor Jijikine), the brutal boss of the local Russian mob outfit.

Later on, Ruslan finds that Catherine is now married to wealthy local defense attorney Terry Goldstein (Robert Wisden). Lanie tells Ruslan that Terry is a jerk. Ruslan pulls Stephen to the side, and Stephen assures Ruslan that he has no interest of joining the family business and just wants to love his new wife and start a new life.

After everyone but Catherine and Lanie leaves to go to the church where the wedding will take place, a pair of men break in, stab Catherine to death, and then stab Lanie, leaving her in critical condition.

Detective Norden (Ingrid Torrance) and Detective Lavastic (Zak Santiago) are heading the investigation. It was made to look like a robbery, but Ruslan knows full well that it was not a robbery. At East Lawn Hospital, Dr. Brown (Linda Minard) tells Ruslan that she expects Lanie to recover.

Ruslan starts his own investigation and learns that Mikhail, who hates Ruslan, was behind the attack. Terry, who is Mikhail`s attorney, is also in on it. Mikhail despised the thought of Stephan marrying a prosecuting attorney instead of following in Mikhail's footsteps, and Catherine was about to blow the whistle on some of Terry's corrupt activities. However, Ruslan is willing to do whatever it takes to make Mikhail and Terry pay for what they did.

Cast

Production
It is set and filmed at Lower Mainland, B.C.,  including the beach in White Rock on May 12 and June 16, 2008.

Home media
On May 19, 2009, DVD and Blu-ray was released by 20th Century Fox Home Entertainment in the United States in Region 1. On 13 July 2009, DVD and Blu-ray was released by Optimum Home Entertainment in the United Kingdom in Region 2.

Soundtrack
 "Shooshino" (David Steele)
 "Something Right" (David Steele)
 "Bulch Blues" (Butch Jularbal Socan)
 "One of Them Days" (Loverboy)
 "Alien Smegma" (David Steele)
 "Island Bound" (Steve Hilliam)

External links
 

2009 films
2009 direct-to-video films
2000s crime action films
American crime action films
Films about organized crime in the United States
American films about revenge
Films set in Toronto
2000s Russian-language films
2000s English-language films
Films directed by Jeff F. King
2000s American films